Gilbert Ballantine (born 14 March 1961) is a retired Surinamese-Dutch kickboxer and a nine times kickboxing world champion. After his kickboxing career Ballantine also took part in Mixed martial arts competition, winning three Rings Dutch championships. Ballantine currently lives in Amsterdam and teaches Kickboxing at Ben Rietdijk Sport, Health & Beauty.

Titles
2002 Rings Dutch -80 kg Champion
2001 Rings Dutch -70 kg Champion (1 title defense)
1992 IMTA Muaythai World Champion (2 title defenses)
1991 IKBF Kickboxing World Lightweight Champion
1991 IKBF Full Contact World Lightweight Champion
1990 WMTA Muaythai World Champion (2 title defenses)
1989 FFKA Kickboxing World Champion
1988 WMTA Muaythai World Champion
1987 EMTA Muaythai European Champion
1987 KICK Kickboxing World Champion
1986 WKA Full Contact European Champion
1986 MTBN Muaythai Dutch Champion
1985 NBFBS Savate Dutch Champion
1984 MTBN Muaythai Dutch Champion
1982 Kyokushin Dutch Open Lightweight runner-up (lost to Lucien Carbin)

Fight record

|-  style="background:#cfc;"
| 2001-03-18 || Win ||align=left| Ridouan El Assrouti||  || Rotterdam, Netherlands || KO ||  ||  || 52-17-1 
|-  bgcolor="#FFBBBB"
| 1999-10-30 || Loss ||align=left| Coscun Dag ||  || Rotterdam, Netherlands || Decision || 5 || 3:00 || 51-17-1
|-  style="background:#cfc;"
| 1998-11-14 || Win ||align=left| Farid Elmoussaui ||  || Amsterdam, Netherlands || Decision || 5 || 3:00 || 51-16-1  
|-  bgcolor="#FFBBBB"
| 1998-04-26 || Loss ||align=left| Kenichi Ogata ||  || Yokohama, Japan || Decision || 5 || 3:00 || 50-16-1
|-  bgcolor="#FFBBBB"
| 1997-11-29 || Loss ||align=left| Takehiro Murahama || Shootboxing || Tokyo, Japan || Decision || 5 || 3:00 || 50-15-1
|-  style="background:#cfc;"
| 1997-06-01 || Win ||align=left| Achmed Gounane ||  || Amsterdam, Netherlands || Decision || 5 || 3:00 || 50-14-1
|-  bgcolor="#FFBBBB"
| 1997 || Loss ||align=left| Fikri Tijarti ||  || Amsterdam, Netherlands || Decision || 5 || 3:00 || 49-14-1
|-  style="background:#cfc;"
| 1996-10-19 || Win ||align=left| Sato ||  || Tokyo, Japan || Decision || 5  || 3:00  || 49-13-1 
|-  bgcolor="#FFBBBB"
| 1996-09-21 || Loss ||align=left| Hector Pena ||  || United States || TKO ||  ||  || 48-13-1
|-  style="background:#cfc;"
| 1995-12-09 || Win ||align=left| Asuka Nobuya ||  || Tokyo, Japan || KO ||  ||  || 48-12-1  
|-  style="background:#cfc;"
| 1995-11-25 || Win ||align=left| Bruno Fuzo ||  || Wiesbaden, Germany || Decision || 5 || 3:00 || 47-12-1 
|-  bgcolor="#FFBBBB"
| 1995-11-17 || Loss ||align=left| Raweenoi Petchudon||Lumpinee Stadium  || Bangkok, Thailand || Decision || 5 || 3:00 || 46-12-1
|-
! style=background:white colspan=9 |
|-
|-  style="background:#cfc;"
| 1995-10-28 || Win ||align=left| Bruno Fuzo || Shock Of Europe || Amsterdam, Netherlands || Decision || 5 || 3:00 || 46-11-1 
|-  style="background:#cfc;"
| 1995-06-10 || Win ||align=left| Osman Yagin ||  || Zurich, Switzerland || KO || 4  || 2:24 || 45-11-1  
|-  style="background:#cfc;"
| 1995-03-25 || Win ||align=left| Satoshi Niizuma ||  || Tokyo, Japan || Decision || 5 || 3:00 || 44-11-1 
|-  style="background:#cfc;"
| 1994-11-12 || Win ||align=left| Noel van de Heuvel ||  || Amsterdam, Netherlands || TKO || 2 ||  || 43-11-1 
|-  style="background:#cfc;"
| 1994-10-20 || Win ||align=left| Chanoy Pon Tawee ||  || Hamburg, Germany || Decision || 5 || 3:00 || 42-11-1 
|-
! style=background:white colspan=9 |
|-
|-  style="background:#cfc;"
| 1994-09-12 || Win ||align=left| Abdullah Quay ||  || Rotterdam, Netherlands || Decision || 5 || 3:00 || 41-11-1 
|-  bgcolor="#FFBBBB"
| 1994-02-20 || Loss ||align=left| Ramon Dekkers ||  || Amsterdam, Netherlands || Decision || 5 || 3:00 || 40-11-1  
|-  bgcolor="#FFBBBB"
| 1993-12-05 || Loss ||align=left| Samart Payakaroon ||  || Bangkok, Thailand || Decision || 5 || 3:00 || 40-10-1
|-  style="background:#cfc;"
| 1993-09-19 || Win ||align=left| Lom-Isan Sor.Thanikul ||  || Amsterdam, Netherlands || Decision || 5 || 3:00 || 40-9-1 
|-
! style=background:white colspan=9 |
|-
|-  bgcolor="#FFBBBB"
| 1993-08-08 || Loss ||align=left| Robert Kaennorasing ||  || Shang Zen, China || Decision || 5 || 3:00 || 39-9-1
|-  style="background:#cfc;"
| 1993-03-07 || Win ||align=left| Iwan Meenis ||  || Amsterdam, Netherlands || Decision || 5 || 3:00 ||  39-8-1
|-  style="background:#cfc;"
| 1993-01-23 || Win ||align=left| Sajchit ||  || Berlin, Germany || Decision || 5 || 3:00 || 38-8-1 
|-  style="background:#cfc;"
| 1992-09-20 || Win ||align=left| Ramon Dekkers ||  || Amsterdam, Netherlands || Decision || 5 || 3:00 || 37-8-1
|-  style="background:#cfc;"
| 1992-06-27 || Win ||align=left| Wittaya Soudareth ||  || Oranjestad, Aruba || KO || 4 ||  || 36-8-2 
|-
! style=background:white colspan=9 |
|-
|-  style="background:#cfc;"
| 1992-03-22 || Win ||align=left| Chanoy Pon Tawee ||  || Amsterdam, Netherlands || Decision || 5 || 3:00 || 35-8-1  
|-
! style=background:white colspan=9 |
|-
|-  style="background:#cfc;"
| 1991-10-19 || Win ||align=left| Michael Kuhr ||  || Berlin, Germany || Decision || 11 || 2:00 || 34-8-1 
|-
! style=background:white colspan=9 |
|-
|-  style="background:#cfc;"
| 1991-02-02 || Win ||align=left| Murat Comert ||  || Karlsruhe, Germany || KO || 6 ||  || 33-8-1 
|-
! style=background:white colspan=9 |
|-
|-  style="background:#cfc;"
| 1990-10-14 || Win ||align=left| Sangtiennoi Sor.Rungroj ||  || Amsterdam, Netherlands || Decision || 5 || 3:00 || 32-8-2  
|-
! style=background:white colspan=9 |
|-
|-  bgcolor="#FFBBBB"
| 1990-05-27 || Loss ||align=left| Kongtoranee Payakaroon ||  || Paris, France || Decision || 5 || 3:00 || 31-8-1
|-  style="background:#cfc;"
| 1990-04-24 || Win ||align=left| Thomas Seiler ||  || Düsseldorf, Germany || TKO || 6 ||  || 31-7-1  
|-  style="background:#cfc;"
| 1990-03-31 || Win ||align=left| Sangyout Narasvath ||  || Brest, France || Decision || 5 || 3:00 || 30-7-1 
|-  style="background:#cfc;"
| 1990-01-28 || Win ||align=left| Fannoy Wittay Kunsong ||  || Amsterdam, Netherlands || Decision || 5 || 3:00 || 29-7-1
|-
! style=background:white colspan=9 |
|-
|-  style="background:#cfc;"
| 1989-11-26 || Win ||align=left| Jorge Angat ||  || Groningen, Netherlands || Decision || 12  || 2:00 ||  28-7-1
|-
! style=background:white colspan=9 |
|-
|-  style="background:#cfc;"
| 1989-10-08 || Win ||align=left| Ramon Dekkers ||  || Amsterdam, Netherlands || Decision || 5 || 3:00 ||  27-7-1
|-  bgcolor="#FFBBBB"
| 1989-04-21 || Loss ||align=left| Steve Demenuck ||  || Portland, United States || Decision ||  10|| 2:00 || 26-7-1
|-  bgcolor="#FFBBBB"
| 1989-04-21 || Loss ||align=left| Chanchai Sor Tamarangsri ||  || France || Decision ||  5|| 3:00 || 26-6-1
|-  style="background:#cfc;"
| 1989-02-19 || Win ||align=left| Deme Pomphet ||   || Amsterdam, Netherlands || TKO || 4 ||  ||  26-5-1
|-  style="background:#cfc;"
| 1988-11-13 || Win ||align=left| Gerold Mamadeus ||   || Enschede, Netherlands || Decision || 7 || 2:00  ||  25-5-1
|-
! style=background:white colspan=9 |
|-
|-  style="background:#cfc;"
| 1988-06-19 || Win ||align=left| Anakhoun ||   || Amsterdam, Netherlands || KO || 4 ||  ||  24-5-1
|-  style="background:#cfc;"
| 1988-02-27 || Win ||align=left| Milo El Geubli ||   || Amsterdam, Netherlands || KO || 3 ||  ||  23-5-1
|-
! style=background:white colspan=9 |
|-
|-  style="background:#cfc;"
| 1987-11-22 || Win ||align=left| Iwan Meenis ||   || Rotterdam, Netherlands || Decision || 5 || 3:00 ||  22-5-1
|-  style="background:#cfc;"
| 1987-11-08 || Win ||align=left| Norris Williams ||   || Amsterdam, Netherlands || KO || 3 ||  ||  21-5-1
|-
! style=background:white colspan=9 |
|-
|-  style="background:#cfc;"
| 1987-09-27 || Win ||align=left| Joao Vieira ||   || Amsterdam, Netherlands || Decision || 5 || 3:00 ||  20-5-1
|-  style="background:#cfc;"
| 1987-04-26 || Win ||align=left| Jun Samon ||   || Amsterdam, Netherlands || KO || 3 ||  ||  19-5-1
|-
! style=background:white colspan=9 |
|-
|-  style="background:#cfc;"
| 1986-11-03 || Win ||align=left| Romeo Charry ||   || Amsterdam, Netherlands || Decision || 5 || 3:00 ||  18-5-1
|-
! style=background:white colspan=9 |
|-
|-  style="background:#cfc;"
| 1986-05-03 || Win ||align=left| Theo Hauser ||   || Hanau, Germany || KO || 7 ||   ||  17-5-1
|-
! style=background:white colspan=9 |
|-
|-  bgcolor="#FFBBBB"
| 1986-03-09 || Loss ||align=left| Espano ||  || Rotterdam, Netherlands || Decision ||  ||  || 16-5-1
|-  style="background:#cfc;"
| 1985-12-07 || Win ||align=left| Richard Nam   ||   || Basse-Terre, Guadeloupe || Decision || 5 || 3:00  ||  16-4-1
|-  style="background:#cfc;"
| 1985-11-30 || Win ||align=left| Rene Desjardins   ||   || Fort-de-France, Martinique || KO || 1 ||  ||  15-4-1
|-  style="background:#cfc;"
| 1985-09-08 || Win ||align=left| Lempoer  ||   || Amsterdam, Netherlands || Decision ||  ||  ||  14-4-1
|-
! style=background:white colspan=9 |
|-
|-  style="background:#cfc;"
| 1985-04-13 || Win ||align=left|  Lav  ||   || Stockholm, Sweden || Decision || 5 || 3:00 ||  13-4-1
|-  bgcolor="#FFBBBB"
| 1985-01-27 || Loss ||align=left| Mousid Akhamrane ||  || Amsterdam, Netherlands || Decision ||  ||  || 12-4-1
|-  style="background:#cfc;"
| 1984-08-16 || Win ||align=left| Joao Vieira ||   || Amsterdam, Netherlands || Decision || 5 || 3:00 ||  12-3-1
|-
! style=background:white colspan=9 |
|-
|-  bgcolor="#FFBBBB"
| 1984-02-17 || Loss ||align=left| Jerome Canabate ||  || Geneve, Switzerland || Decision ||  ||  || 11-3-1
|-  style="background:#cfc;"
| 1984-04-01 || Win ||align=left| Ratske||  || Germany || KO || 2 ||  ||  11-2-1
|-  bgcolor="#FFBBBB"
| 1984-02-17 || Loss ||align=left| Sodaret Ratchy ||  || Paris, France || KO || 3 ||  || 10-2-1
|-  style="background:#cfc;"
| 1983-12-19 || Win ||align=left| Philippe Cantamesi  ||  || Paris, France || Decision || 5 || 3:00  ||  10-1-1
|-  style="background:#cfc;"
| 1983-11-27 || Win ||align=left| Jacky Vonk  ||  || Amsterdam, Netherlands || KO || 1 ||  ||  9-1-1
|-  style="background:#cfc;"
| 1983-06-08 || Win ||align=left| Joao Vieira ||  || Amsterdam, Netherlands || Decision ||  ||  ||  8-1-1
|-  style="background:#cfc;"
| 1983-05-23 || Win ||align=left| Romeo Charry ||  || Amsterdam, Netherlands || Decision ||  ||  ||  7-1-1
|-  bgcolor="#FFBBBB"
| 1982-04-04 || Loss ||align=left| Ronnie Green ||  || Amsterdam, Netherlands || Decision || 5 || 3:00 || 6-1-1
|-  bgcolor="#c5d2ea"
| 1982-01-17 || Draw ||align=left| Ivan Sprang ||  || Amsterdam, Netherlands || Decision draw || 5 || 3:00 ||  6-0-1
|-  style="background:#cfc;"
| 1981-11-23 || Win ||align=left| Kok ||  || Amsterdam, Netherlands || Decision ||  ||  ||  6-0
|-  style="background:#cfc;"
| 1981-10-03 || Win ||align=left| Fortes ||  || Rotterdam, Netherlands || Decision ||  ||  ||  5-0
|-  style="background:#cfc;"
| 1981-09-20 || Win ||align=left| John Hardenbol ||  || Amsterdam, Netherlands || KO || 1 ||  ||  4-0
|-  style="background:#cfc;"
| 1981-06-01 || Win ||align=left| Grandjean ||  || Amsterdam, Netherlands || Decision ||  ||  ||  3-0
|-  style="background:#cfc;"
| 1981-05-17 || Win ||align=left| Meis ||  || Rotterdam, Netherlands || Decision ||  ||  ||  2-0
|-  style="background:#cfc;"
| 1981-03-09 || Win ||align=left| Blom ||  || Amsterdam, Netherlands || Decision ||  ||  ||  1-0
|-
|-
| colspan=9 | Legend:

Mixed martial arts record

|-
| Draw
|align=center| 3-1–2
| Robbie Nelson
|Draw
|It's Showtime - Amsterdam Arena
|
|align=center| 2 
|align=center| 5:00
|Haarlem, Netherlands
|
|-
|Loss
|align=center| 3-1-1
| Sahin Yakut
|TKO (Doctor Stoppage)
|Rings Holland - One Moment In Time
|
|align=center| 1
|align=center| 0:51
|Utrecht, Netherlands
|
|-
| Draw
|align=center| 3-0–1
| Robbie Nelson
|Draw
|It's Showtime - As Usual
|
|align=center| 2 
|align=center| 5:00
|Haarlem, Netherlands
|
|-
|Win
|align=center| 3-0
| Ronnie Rivano
|KO (Punch)
|Rings Holland - Saved by the Bell
|
|align=center| 3
|align=center| 1:20
|Amsterdam, Netherlands
|Wins Rings Dutch -80 kg title.
|-
|Win
|align=center| 2-0
| Daan Kooiman
|Submission (Guillotine Choke)
|Rings Holland - Some Like It Hard
|
|align=center| 1
|align=center| 2:30
|Utrecht, Netherlands
|Defends Rings Dutch -70 kg title.
|-
|Win
|align=center| 1-0
| Brian Lo-A-Njoe
|TKO (Punches and Knee)
|Rings Holland - Heroes Live Forever
|
|align=center| 2
|align=center| 2:09
|Utrecht, Netherlands
| Wins Rings Dutch -70 kg title.
|-

See also
List of K-1 events
List of male kickboxers

References

External links
Gilbert Ballantine official website

1961 births
Living people
Dutch male kickboxers
Dutch male mixed martial artists
Surinamese male kickboxers
Surinamese male mixed martial artists
Lightweight kickboxers
Mixed martial artists utilizing Wadō-ryū
Mixed martial artists utilizing judo
Mixed martial artists utilizing silat
Mixed martial artists utilizing savate
Mixed martial artists utilizing shootboxing
Mixed martial artists utilizing Muay Thai
Sportspeople from Paramaribo
Dutch male karateka
Surinamese male karateka
Dutch Muay Thai practitioners
Surinamese Muay Thai practitioners
Dutch savateurs
Surinamese savateurs